Navroze Godrej, son of Indian industrialist Jamshyd Godrej, is the Executive Director of Godrej & Boyce and leads Strategy and Innovation for the group.

He is the only member of the fourth generation of the Godrejs so far to be inducted on the company's board.

Early life 
He has a Master of Design degree from the IIT Institute of Design, Chicago. He has been involved in the development of new businesses like Chotukool and U&Us Design Studio.

Career 
He joined the Godrej group in 2005. Currently he is the Non-Executive Director of Godrej & Boyce. As a leader of Strategy and Innovation for the group, Navroze created Hubble, which is a space to innovate and to re-imagine the corporate environment and workspace relationships.

Beyond Godrej 
He is the Co-chairman of the Confederation of Indian Industry (CII) National Committee on Design and is also a Board Member of the Global Innovation and Technology Alliance (GITA).

References 

Godrej Group
Godrej family